3RPH/T is the call sign of two radio stations in Victoria, Australia, both part of the Vision Australia Radio network:

3RPH Warragul
3RPH Warrnambool